Alain Reist (born December 7, 1979) is a Swiss former professional ice hockey defenceman who played 11 seasons in the National League A (NLA).

Reist made his NLA debut playing with SC Rapperswil-Jona during the 1999–2000 season.

Career statistics

References

External links

1979 births
Living people
EHC Biel players
HC Fribourg-Gottéron players
EHC Kloten players
Lausanne HC players
Swiss ice hockey defencemen
People from Biel/Bienne
ZSC Lions players
Sportspeople from the canton of Bern